Samarkand State University (SamSU) is a public university in Samarkand, Uzbekistan established by a government decree of the Government of Uzbekistan on 22 January 1927 in the city of Samarkand. The university is commonly known as Samarkand University (in Uzbek Samarqand universiteti)

History
The university was originally organized in 1927 as the Uzbek Pedagogical Institute and in 1930, it was renamed the Uzbek State Pedagogical Academy and in 1933, upon merger of the Pedagogical Academy and the Uzbek State Medical Institute into the Uzbek State University. In 1941—2016, the University was named after poet and philosopher Ali-Shir Nava'i (alternative transliteration Alisher Navoi).

In 1961, the Uzbek State University was finally renamed the Samarkand State University, a name it keeps to date. The rector of the university since 2015 is Dr. Alimdjan Rakhimovich Khalmukhamedov.

Currently, the University comprises the following faculties: Philology; History and Philosophy; Teaching; Physics and Mathematics; Biology; Economy; Tajik Philology; Russian Philology; Law; Physical education.

Bachelor level programs
NATURAL SCIENCES:
1. DIGITAL TECHNOLOGIES 
 Applied mathematics 
 Software engineering 
 Computer Science & programming technologies
2. MATHEMATICS 
 Mechanics 
 Mathematics 
 Methods of teaching mathematics
3. PHYSICS
 Physics 
 Astronomy 
 Biomedical physics 
 Methods of teaching physics & astronomy
4. BIOLOGY 
 Biology (by types) 
 Biology teaching methods 
 Biotechnology (food, feed, chemistry & agriculture) 
 Technology of cultivation & processing of medicinal plants
5. CHEMISTRY 
 Chemistry 
 Chemical technology 
 Materials science & chemistry of new materials 
 Chemistry teaching methods
HUMANITIES:
6. HISTORY 
 Archeology 
 History (by countries and regions)
7. GEOGRAPHY & ECOLOGY 
 Geography 
 Hydrometeorology 
 Ecology & environmental protection
8. DIGITAL ECONOMICS 
 Economics 
 Economics, human resources management
9. TEACHING 
 Pedagogy & psychology 
 Primary education & sports education
10. PRE-SCHOOL EDUCATION 
 Preschool education 
 Technological education: labor education 
 Technological education: music education 
 Technological education: fine arts & engineering graphics
11. PSYCHOLOGY & PHILOSOPHY 
 Sociology 
 Philosophy 
 Psychology (by type of activity) 
 Social work (in different areas of activity) 
 National ideology, fundamentals of spirituality & legal education
INTERNATIONAL:
12. INTERNATIONAL PROGRAMS 
 Preschool education 
 Mechatronics & robotics 
 Applied mathematics & informatics 
 History (History of the Great Silk Road) 
 Materials science & new materials technology
LANGUAGES, ARTS & SPORTS:
13. PHILOLOGY 
 Philology & language teaching (Uzbek) 
 Philology & language teaching (Tajik) 
 Publishing
14. RUSSIAN LANGUAGE PHILOLOGY 
 Philology & language teaching: Russian 
 Foreign language literature: English 
 Russian language & literature (in other language groups)
15. ART 
 Music education 
 Handcrafts education 
 Fine arts & engineering graphics
16. SPORT 
 Physical culture 
 Sports activities (in the field of women's sports)
NEW PROGRAMS STARTING IN 2020:
17. LAW
18. AGROBIOTECHNOLOGY

See also
List of universities in Uzbekistan

References

External links
Official website

Samarkand State University
Educational institutions established in 1927
1927 establishments in the Soviet Union
Buildings and structures in Samarkand